Live Ripper is the second live VHS released by Japanese rock duo B'z, and documents a show during the tour supporting their 1992 album RUN. It was later released on DVD, on March 14, 2001.

Live Ripper marks the first performance of Jap the Ripper, a song that would appear on the band's next album, The 7th Blues.

Track listing 

Jap The Ripper
Zero
Native Dance
Time
Stay Tonight
Gekkou (月光)
Wanna Go Home
Gimme Your Love
Kairaku No Heya (快楽の部屋)
Hadashi No Megami (裸足の女神) 
Blowin'
Run
One For The Road
Sayonara Nankawa Iwasenai (さよならなんかは言わせない)

External links 
B'z Official Website 

B'z video albums